Syedna Mohammed Badruddin (died on 29 Jumada al-Akhir 1256 AH/1840 AD, Surat, India) was the 46th Da'i al-Mutlaq of the Dawoodi Bohra. He succeeded the 45th Da'i, Syedna Tayyeb Zainuddin, to the religious post. He was born in Bharuch in 1811. He was seven years old when his father Syedna Abde'Ali Saifuddin died. He was taken under the care of Syedna Mohammed Ezzuddin who brought him up and nurtured him for four years.

Syedna Mohammed Badruddin became Da'i al-Mutlaq in 1252 AH/1836 AD. His period of Da'wat was 1252–1256 AH/1836–1840 AD.

Syedna Mohammed Badruddin married Amatullah AaiSaheba, daughter of Syedna Tayyeb Zainuddin.

 Da'i period: 1252–1256 AH/1836–1840 AD
 Place of Da'i office: Surat, India
 Death: 29 Jumada al-Akhir 1256
 Ma'zoon: Syedi Hebatullah Jamaluddin
 Mukasir: Abdul Qadir Najmuddin

References

Further reading
The Ismaili, their history and doctrine by Farhad Daftary (Chapter -Mustalian Ismailism- p. 300-310)

1840 deaths
1811 births
19th-century Ismailis